The Litchfield rock gehyra (Gehyra lapistola) is a species of gecko. It is endemic to Northern Territory in Australia.

References

lapistola
Geckos of Australia
Endemic fauna of Australia
Reptiles described in 2020
Taxa named by Paul M. Oliver
Taxa named by Leonardo G. Tedeschi
Taxa named by Ryan J. Ellis
Taxa named by Paul Doughty
Taxa named by Craig Moritz